Myrtle Hill, located near Owingsville, Kentucky, is a Federal-style house and outbuildings dating from 1815.  It was listed on the National Register of Historic Places in 1982.  The listing includes four contributing buildings.

The main house is a one-and-a-half-story brick residence.

References

Houses on the National Register of Historic Places in Kentucky
Federal architecture in Kentucky
Houses completed in 1815
National Register of Historic Places in Bath County, Kentucky
1815 establishments in Kentucky